The canton of Millau-1 is an administrative division of the Aveyron department, southern France. It was created at the French canton reorganisation which came into effect in March 2015. Its seat is in Millau.

It consists of the following communes:
Comprégnac
Creissels
Millau (partly)
Saint-Georges-de-Luzençon

References

Cantons of Aveyron